Mayberry is a surname of Old English origin. It is a locational name, a dialectical variant of the placename Maesbury in Shropshire.

List
Notable people with the surname include:
 Andy Mayberry (born 1970), American politician
 George Mayberry (1884–1961), Irish track and field athlete
 Des Maybery (1924–2009), South African rower
 George Mayberry (1883–1961), Irish track and field athlete
 John Mayberry (born 1949), American baseball first baseman
 John Mayberry, Jr. (born 1983), American baseball outfielder
 John Penn Mayberry (born 1939), American philosopher and mathematician
 Jermane Mayberry (born 1973), American football offensive lineman
 Julie Mayberry (born c. 1971), American politician
 Lauren Mayberry (born 1987), Scottish musician
 Lee Mayberry (born 1970), American basketball guard
 Mariann Mayberry (1965–2017), American television and stage actress
 Marty Mayberry (born 1986), Australian Paralympic alpine skier
 Matt Mayberry (born 1987), American football player
 Russ Mayberry (1925–2012), Scottish-born American television director
 Tony Mayberry (born 1967), American football player
 Walter "Tiger" Mayberry (1915–1944), American football player and fighter pilot

See also
 Maberry

References

English-language surnames
Surnames of Old English origin
English toponymic surnames